Bobby Setiabudi (born 22 March 2001) is an Indonesian badminton player affiliated with Djarum club. He was part of the national junior team that won the first Suhandinata Cup for Indonesia in 2019 BWF World Junior Championships.

Achievements

BWF International Challenge/Series (1 title) 
Men's singles

 BWF International Challenge tournament
 BWF International Series tournament
 BWF Future Series tournament

BWF Junior International (1 title, 3 runners-up)  
Boys' singles

  BWF Junior International Grand Prix tournament
  BWF Junior International Challenge tournament
  BWF Junior International Series tournament
  BWF Junior Future Series tournament

Performance timeline

National team 
 Junior level

 Senior level

Individual competitions 
 Junior level

 Senior level

References

External links 
 

2001 births
Living people
People from Situbondo Regency
Sportspeople from East Java
Indonesian male badminton players
Competitors at the 2021 Southeast Asian Games
Southeast Asian Games bronze medalists for Indonesia
Southeast Asian Games medalists in badminton